Csaba Kuttor (born August 19, 1975 in Miskolc, Borsod-Abaúj-Zemplén) is an athlete from Hungary.  He competes in triathlon. Kuttor competed at the first Olympic triathlon at the 2000 Summer Olympics.  He took thirtieth place with a total time of 1:51:05.74.

Four years later, he qualified himself for the 2004 Summer Olympics. This time he could not compete in the race because of an illness.

At the 2008 Summer Olympics he took 47th place with a total time of 1:55:53.38.

References
sports-reference

1975 births
Living people
Hungarian male triathletes
Triathletes at the 2000 Summer Olympics
Triathletes at the 2008 Summer Olympics
Olympic triathletes of Hungary
Sportspeople from Miskolc